"Cose della vita" (translated: Things in life) is a song originally released in 1993 by Italian musician, singer and songwriter Eros Ramazzotti and included on his fifth album, Tutte storie (1993). The single's highest chart placing was number one in Belgium and number three in Spain. The original version also was a smash hit in Argentina, Chile, Mexico and Uruguay in the fall of 1993, gaining strong TV rotation. The accompanying music video for the song was directed by Spike Lee.

The song saw an international revival through a bilingual Italian-English version released in late 1997 as a duet with American singer Tina Turner. The additional English lyrics were by James Ralston and Tina Turner herself. The track was included in a later greatest hits compilation album by Ramazzotti titled Eros, released on 28 October 1997.

Critical reception
Pan-European magazine Music & Media wrote, "The intro of Cose Della Vita—Italian for "Things of Life"—is unexpectedly rocky, followed by "Spaghetti Western twang" guitar that rolls into one of the finest ballads of the year." Head of music Vranz van Maaren at Sky Radio/Bussum (Holland) cut the rough intro immediately. He said, "Eros is a core artist for our typical ACE outlet, but he shouldn't use that 'quick start' again. We have this beautiful song in medium rotation now, as it is a new record. Depending on what will happen, we might increase rotation levels."

"Cosas de la vida"
As is traditional with many other successful releases of Ramazzotti songs, he released a Spanish language parallel release for Spain, Mexico, Latin America and USA Latin markets titled "Cosas de la vida". That version appears in the parallel Spanish-language version to the album Tutte storie, retitled Todo historias.

Charts

Weekly charts

Year-end charts

Sales

Eros Ramazzotti and Tina Turner version

The track was re-recorded by Ramazzotti and American singer and actress Tina Turner, and re-released in December 1997 as a single from Ramazzotti's first greatest hits compilation album, Eros. This time the song was bilingual and retitled "Cose della vita (Can't Stop Thinking of You)". The additional English lyrics were by Turner herself and James Ralston. The re-release was accompanied by a music video shot in September 1997, and directed by Nigel Dick.

The duet version charted better, with a peak in the Netherlands and Germany at number four.

Ramazzotti later re-recorded a Spanish-language version with Turner's English vocals called "Cosas de la Vida – Can't Stop Thinking of You", and a live version of the Italian-English version featuring Tina Turner was included on his album Live.

"Cose Della Vita (Can't Stop Thinking of You)" has been included on Tina Turner's greatest hits albums All the Best (2004) and The Platinum Collection (2009).

Critical reception
Larry Flick from Billboard wrote, "If you haven't joined the millions of people around the world who happily feast on the suave Italo-belting of Ramazzotti, then you need to catch up. This rock-edged pop chugger from his self-titled album is a good place to start. It shows him at his most magnetic, darting around the track's crisp rhythms and limber electric guitar riffs. The Italian-language tune has been translated into English, allowing special guest Turner to wail and vamp admirably. Her voice meshes perfectly with Ramazzotti's when they harmonize in English—leaving the listener wondering how long it will be before this international star will cut an album specifically for the American market."

Charts and certifications

Weekly charts

Year-end charts

Certifications

References

External links

1993 songs
1997 songs
Tina Turner songs
Eros Ramazzotti songs
Male–female vocal duets
Macaronic songs
Music videos directed by Spike Lee
Songs written by Eros Ramazzotti